Kill Devil Hill is an American rock supergroup, founded in 2011 by drummer Vinny Appice (former Black Sabbath, Heaven & Hell, and Dio), bassist Rex Brown (former Pantera and Down), guitarist Mark Zavon (former 40 Cycle Hum), and lead vocalist Dewey Bragg. The band is named after the town of Kill Devil Hills, North Carolina, a location renowned from pirating days. 

The band's sound has been described as "heavy and modern without succumbing to typical contemporary hardcore trappings – indecipherable vocals or overused blast beats."

History 
Kill Devil Hill released their self-titled debut album in May 2012. They toured the US with rock band Adrenaline Mob.

On March 10, 2014, it was announced that Vinny Appice had left the band in order to commit to other things and projects, and that former Type O Negative drummer Johnny Kelly was his replacement. Appice later stated his leaving the band was due to the lack of punctuality of his other bandmates.

The band performed on Motörhead's Boat Cruise in September 2014 and after touring, the band started to write another album with their new member Johnny Kelly. They decided to record at Stagg Street Studios in California with help from engineer Josh Newell (Linkin Park, In This Moment).

On February 24th, 2023 the band released a new single titled "Blood In The Water" from their upcoming unnamed album.

Band members

Current
Dewey Bragg – lead vocals 
Mark Zavon – guitar 
Johnny Kelly – drums 
Matt Snell – bass

Former
Rex Brown – bass 
Vinny Appice – drums 
Nico D'Arnese – bass

Discography
 Kill Devil Hill (2012)
 Revolution Rise (2013)

Trivia 
In July 2015, Texas Hippie Coalition bassist John Exall started a new musical ensemble called Smoke Hollow along with three musicians: Ashes from Static-X, Dewey Bragg from Kill Devil Hill, and Ralf Mueggler from Crowned by Fire.

Kill Devil Hills, North Carolina, the town the band is named after, is best known as the site of the Wright brothers's first failed attempt at flying, resulting in the destruction of their catapulted projectile.

References

External links

Heavy metal supergroups
Musical groups established in 2011
Heavy metal musical groups from North Carolina
American alternative metal musical groups
2011 establishments in North Carolina